Rasmus Christoffer Elm (born 17 March 1988) is a Swedish former professional footballer who played as a midfielder. He is currently the assistant coach of Kalmar FF. During his career, he played for Kalmar FF in Sweden, for AZ in the Netherlands and the Russian side CSKA Moscow. Elm earned 39 caps for Sweden between 2009 and 2013 and competed at UEFA Euro 2012. He is the younger brother of Viktor and David Elm.

Club career

Early career

In his childhood, Elm played for Johansfors IF and Emmaboda IS, before he signed in January 2005 for Kalmar FF.

Kalmar FF 
In four-and-a-half years with the Allsvenskan club, Elm played 96 games and scored 17 goals. While at Kalmar, he helped the team win the 2007 Svenska Cupen, the 2008 Allsvenskan, and the 2009 Svenska Supercupen.

AZ
On 27 August 2009, Elm signed a four-year deal with Eredivisie side AZ Alkmaar. He made his debut on 12 September 2009 in the 2–1 loss against ADO Den Haag.

Former Swedish national team coach Lars Lagerbäck once commented that Elm was the biggest talent Sweden has produced since Zlatan Ibrahimović. While suffering from injuries and illness during his first two seasons in AZ, Elm experience a successful 2011–12 season. He received several player of the match awards during that season and was praised by the press and the fans for his passing and free kicks as well as his goal scoring.

Elm played a total of 83 matches for AZ before he left the club during the summer of 2012.

CSKA Moscow
On 30 July 2012, Elm signed a three-year contract with Russian Premier League side CSKA Moscow, taking the shirt number 20. On 21 October 2012, he scored his first goal for CSKA after converting a penalty at home against Rubin Kazan in a 2–0 victory. On 3 January 2015, Elm had his contract with CSKA terminated by mutual consent in order to recover from a long-term stomach illness that had left him unable to train with the club.

Return to Kalmar FF and retirement 
Elm returned to Kalmar FF and Sweden ahead of the 2015 Allsvenskan season. In early 2020, Elm announced his retirement from professional football, citing health issues related to his stomach illness.

International career
Elm was the captain of the Swedish under-19 squad until August 2007, when he made his debut for the U21 squad. On 11 February 2009, Elm scored his first goal for the Swedish senior team in a friendly against Austria. He represented Sweden at Euro 2012. On 16 October 2012, he scored the fourth and equalising goal in Sweden's remarkable 4–4 draw in Berlin against Germany in 2014 FIFA World Cup qualification – UEFA Group C. The Swedes were losing 0–4 until the last 29 minutes of the game when a flurry of Swedish goals were capped by the stoppage time goal from Elm. The result was hailed as one of the greatest sporting achievements in Swedish history.

Personal life
Both of his siblings have also played professional football: David, who previously played for Fulham, and his other brother Viktor, who previously played for the Dutch club AZ.

Career statistics

Club
As of 19 March 2021

International

International goals

Sweden's goal tally listed first. The score column shows the score after each Elm goal.

Honours
Kalmar FF
Allsvenskan: 2008
Svenska Cupen: 2007
Svenska Supercupen: 2009

CSKA Moscow
Russian Premier League: 2012–13, 2013–14
Russian Cup: 2012–13
Russian Super Cup: 2013, 2014
Individual

 Stor Grabb: 2012

References

External links
 
 
 Rasmus Elm at Kalmar FF 
 
 

1988 births
Living people
People from Kalmar
Association football midfielders
Swedish footballers
Kalmar FF players
AZ Alkmaar players
PFC CSKA Moscow players
Allsvenskan players
Eredivisie players
Russian Premier League players
Sweden youth international footballers
Sweden under-21 international footballers
Sweden international footballers
Swedish expatriate footballers
Expatriate footballers in the Netherlands
Swedish expatriate sportspeople in the Netherlands
Expatriate footballers in Russia
Swedish expatriate sportspeople in Russia
UEFA Euro 2012 players
Sportspeople from Kalmar County